α-Difluoromethyl-DOPA (DFMD, DFM-DOPA) is a DOPA decarboxylase inhibitor.

See also 
 Carbidopa
 Methyldopa

References 

Aromatic L-amino acid decarboxylase inhibitors
Amino acids
Catecholamines
Organofluorides